Portugal competed at the 2004 Summer Paralympics in Athens, Greece. The team included 29 athletes, 22 men and 7 women. Competitors from Portugal won 12 medals, including 2 gold, 5 silver and 5 bronze to finish 41st in the medal table.

Medalists

Sports

Athletics

Men's track

Women's track

Boccia

Individual events

Pairs/Team events

Cycling

Men's road

Equestrian

Swimming

Men

Women

See also
Portugal at the Paralympics
Portugal at the 2004 Summer Olympics

References 

Nations at the 2004 Summer Paralympics
2004
Summer Paralympics